Dave Kaplan is an American music industry executive. He has managed numerous musical artists, including UB40, Glen Campbell, Dave Stewart of the Eurythmics, Brian Setzer,  Sublime, and Butthole Surfers. He founded and is the  CEO of the independent music label Surfdog Records. Kaplan’s producing credits include albums for Dave Stewart, Glen Campbell, Brian Setzer, Stray Cats, Dan Hicks, SuperHeavy, and Gary Hoey.

Early life and education 
 
Kaplan was born in Phoenix, Arizona. He graduated from UC Santa Barbara, and later became a certified public accountant.

Career 
 
Kaplan joined the accounting firm Ernst & Whinney in California as an auditor in 1981. Kaplan disliked the firm’s rigid work culture, and left in 1983 to join a company that sold t-shirts bearing licensed images of pop-stars. 
 
In 1985, he founded Dave Kaplan Management (DKM) to manage musicians. DKM’s first client was the reggae band UB40.
 
Kaplan became the manager for Brian Setzer in 1992. As of 2021, Kaplan had produced or been the executive producer on 13 albums by Setzer and his two related bands, Brian Setzer Orchestra and Stray Cats.  
 
Kaplan founded Surfdog Records in the early 1990s.
 
In 1999, Kaplan became the manager for Butthole Surfers, and signed the act to a joint recording deal with Surfdog and Hollywood Records. 
 
Kaplan signed recording deals with Dan Hicks and His Hot Licks, led by Dan Hicks, in 2000 and British soul singer Joss Stone in 2011 to co-produce her album LP1. He produced or was the executive producer for six of Hicks’ albums between 2000 and 2017, and was the executive producer for Stone’s LP1 album. 
 
Kaplan co-wrote two songs with the band Sprung Monkey in 2001, “Get A Taste” and “So Cal Loco (Party Like A Rock Star)”. 
 
In 2012, Kaplan became co-manager of country singer Glen Campbell, who had just been diagnosed with Alzheimer’s Disease, and was the executive producer of his final album Ghost on the Canvas. Kaplan was also the executive producer for “See You There” and for 'Live from the Troubadour, a posthumous Campbell album released in 2021. 
 
In 2013, Kaplan signed Eric Clapton to Surfdog Records and distributed his new album, Old Sock, in North America. 
 
Kaplan is also the manager of the band Sublime. In 2019, Kaplan was a co-producer of a documentary about the band Sublime, which was titled Sublime.

Charitable activities 
 
Kaplan produced an ocean-themed music album titled MOM: Music for Our Mother Ocean to benefit the Surfrider Foundation, an environmental non-profit focused on cleaning up beaches and the ocean. The album, which was released in 1996, included tracks by 20 different artists, including Pearl Jam, Brian Setzer, The Beastie Boys, Porno for Pyros, and The Ramones. Kaplan executive-produced a sequel MOM album in 1997, which featured artists including The Beach Boys, The Mighty Mighty Bosstones, and Pennywise. Kaplan was also the executive producer for a third MOM album, released in 1999. 
 
He has also served on the board of directors for the Surfrider Foundation.

Personal life 
 
Kaplan and his family live in southern California. He is a surfing enthusiast.

References 

American music industry executives

Year of birth missing (living people)
Living people
Businesspeople from Phoenix, Arizona
American accountants
University of California, Santa Barbara alumni
American chief executives
Ernst & Young people